Major General John Dalyell Richardson,  (23 April 1880 – 29 July 1954) was an Australian dairy farmer and a senior officer in the Australian Army during the Second World War.

References

1880 births
1954 deaths
Military personnel from New South Wales
Australian Companions of the Distinguished Service Order
Australian farmers
Australian generals
Australian military personnel of World War I
Australian Army personnel of World War II
People educated at Sydney Grammar School
People from the Hunter Region